Simiolus is an extinct genus of dendropithecid primates. It was described by Mary Leakey and Richard Leakey in 1987, and the type species is S. enjiessi, which existed during the Miocene of Kenya. The species epithet is a phonetic pun on the acronym NGS. A new species, S. andrewsi, also from the middle Miocene of Kenya, was described by Terry Harrison in 2010. In November 2018, scientists reported the discovery of the smallest known ape, Simiolus minutus, which weighed approximately eight pounds, and lived about 12.5 million years ago in Kenya in East Africa.

Species
 Simiolus enjiessi Leakey & Leakey, 1987
 Simiolus leakeyorum 
 Simiolus cheptumoae Pickford & Kunimatsu, 2005 
 Simiolus andrewsi Harrison, 2010
 Simiolus minutus Rossie & Hill, 2018

Notes

References

Miocene primates of Africa
Miocene mammals of Africa
Prehistoric primate genera
Fossil taxa described in 1987